Stanko Todorov Georgiev (10 December 1920 – 17 December 1996) was a Bulgarian communist politician.

Todorov was born in Pernik Province. Before and during World War II he was a worker. He became interested in communism, and joined the underground Bulgarian Communist Party in 1943. By 1948, communists had come to power in Bulgaria, and Todorov began to rise through the ranks of the government. He became a member of the politburo in 1961 and held several government posts. He served as Prime Minister of Bulgaria, the third highest post in the country, from July 7, 1971 until June 16, 1981. At 9 years and 344 days, he is the longest-serving Bulgarian prime minister. He then became chairman of the parliament, serving in that position until the first multiparty elections in 1990. He supported the reformist wing of the Communist Party during this time, as pressure mounted on Bulgaria and other eastern European countries to reform. He took part in the removal of long-time party leader Todor Zhivkov from office in 1989. Just before the 1990 elections, Todorov served as acting President of Bulgaria from July 6, 1990 to July 17, 1990. He won a parliamentary seat in the elections, but resigned later that year for health reasons. 

1920 births
1996 deaths
Chairpersons of the National Assembly of Bulgaria
People from Pernik Province
Presidents of Bulgaria
Prime Ministers of Bulgaria
Deputy prime ministers of Bulgaria